Papua New Guinea requires its residents to register their motor vehicles and display vehicle registration plates. Current plates are Australian standard 372 mm × 134 mm, and use Australian stamping dies.

BFP-968

Papua New Guinea
Transport in Papua New Guinea
Papua New Guinea transport-related lists